Indohyaenodon ("indian Hyaenodon") is a genus of extinct hyaenodont mammals from family Indohyaenodontidae, that lived during the early Eocene in India.

Phylogeny
The phylogenetic relationships of genus Indohyaenodon are shown in the following cladogram.

See also
 Mammal classification
 Indohyaenodontidae

References

Hyaenodonts
Eocene mammals
Fossil taxa described in 2009
Extinct animals of India
Prehistoric placental genera